Great Bend is a center of media in central Kansas. The following is a list of media outlets based in the city.

Print
Great Bend has one daily newspaper, The Great Bend Tribune.

Radio
The following radio stations are licensed to and/or broadcast from Great Bend:

AM

FM

Television
Great Bend is in the Wichita-Hutchinson, Kansas television market. The following television stations are licensed to and/or broadcast from Great Bend:

References

Mass media in Kansas